Luigi Bartesaghi (14 October 1932 – 10 November 2022) was a Canadian cyclist. He competed in the individual road race at the 1960 Summer Olympics. Bartesaghi died in Lecco on 10 November 2022, at the age of 90.

References

External links
 

1932 births
2022 deaths
Canadian male cyclists
Italian emigrants to Canada
Olympic cyclists of Canada
Cyclists at the 1960 Summer Olympics
Sportspeople from Lecco